Pandari is a small village in East Champaran district of Bihar state, India. It falls under Dhaka block, and is 230 km from Patna, the capital of Bihar.

Villages in East Champaran district